In mathematics, an extensive category is a category C with finite coproducts that are disjoint and well-behaved with respect to pullbacks. Equivalently, C is extensive if the coproduct functor from the product of the slice categories C/X × C/Y to the slice category C/(X + Y) is an equivalence of categories for all objects X and Y of C.

Examples
The categories Set and Top of sets and topological spaces, respectively, are extensive categories. More generally, the category of presheaves on any small category is extensive.

The category CRingop of affine schemes is extensive.

References

External links
 

Category theory